Reinier Lambertus van de Kerkhof (born 16 September 1951) is a Dutch former professional footballer who played as a right winger for FC Twente, PSV Eindhoven and the Netherlands national team.

Career
Van de Kerkhof and his twin brother Willy were squad members of the Dutch national team that made the World Cup final in 1974 and became key players in the team that made the 1978 final, losing to hosts West Germany and Argentina, respectively. Overall, van de Kerkhof appeared 47 times for his country, scoring five goals.

He is well remembered due to the incident before the 1978 World Cup final, when the opponent Argentia national team objected to the cast he wore on his injured forearm since it could have injured an Argentinian player. Despite the bandage having been passed by FIFA and worn in previous matches, the referee, Italian Sergio Gonella vacillated. The Dutch players threatened to walk off the field in protest, delaying the kickoff of the game. Finally an extra layer of padding was applied to the bandage as a solution, and the match could start.

1978 was his most successful year, besides becoming runners-up at the World Cup, he also won the UEFA Cup, the Dutch championship and the KNVB Beker with PSV that year: "we had won everything possible – the title, the Dutch Cup and the UEFA Cup, and we had five or six players who had been runners-up at the FIFA World Cup in Argentina with the Netherlands. It was a beautiful period under coach Kees Rijvers", van de Kerkhof later would tell to Berend Scholten.

Van de Kerkhof was named by Pelé as one of the top 125 greatest living footballers in March 2004.

Career statistics

Club

Honours 
PSV Eindhoven
Eredivisie: 1974–75, 1975–76, 1977–78
KNVB Cup: 1973–74, 1975–76

Seiko
Hong Kong First Division: 1984–85
Hong Kong Senior Shield: 1984–85

Netherlands
FIFA World Cup runner-up: 1974, 1978
UEFA European Championship third place: 1976

Individual
 FIFA 100

References 

1951 births
Living people
Dutch footballers
FIFA 100
UEFA Cup winning players
Association football forwards
Netherlands international footballers
Eredivisie players
Eerste Divisie players
Super League Greece players
Hong Kong First Division League players
FC Twente players
PSV Eindhoven players
FC Eindhoven players
Helmond Sport players
Apollon Smyrnis F.C. players
Seiko SA players
1974 FIFA World Cup players
UEFA Euro 1976 players
1978 FIFA World Cup players
UEFA Euro 1980 players
Dutch beach soccer players
Dutch twins
Sportspeople from Helmond
Twin sportspeople
Identical twins
Dutch expatriate footballers
Dutch expatriate sportspeople in Greece
Expatriate footballers in Greece
Dutch expatriate sportspeople in Hong Kong
Expatriate footballers in Hong Kong
Footballers from North Brabant